or Medieval Showa was a  after Ōchō and before Bunpō. This period spanned the years from March 1312 through February 1317.

Etymology
The era name is derived from the Old Book of Tang, a Classical Chinese work composed in AD 941–945. The first character is shō (正), meaning "proper, straight, true", while 和 (wa) means "peace," and may also pun on Wa (倭), an ancient name for Japan. The era name is pronounced like the Shōwa era of 1926–1989, but that era name is written with the character 昭 ("illustrious") for shō.

Change of era
 1311 : The new era name was created to mark an event or series of events. The previous era ended and the new one commenced in Ōchō 2.

Events of the Shōwa era
Initially, former-Emperor Fushimi administered the court up through the time he took the tonsure as a Buddhist monk.
 
 1313 (Shōwa 2, 10th month): Retired Emperor Fushimi shaved his head and became a Buddhist monk; and the power to administer the court of reigning Emperor Hanazono shifted to his adopted son, former-Emperor Go-Fushimi.
 1314 (Shōwa 3, 11th month): Hōjō Sadaaki ended his role at Rokuhara Tandai in Kyoto; and he returned to Kamakura.
 1315 (Shōwa 4, 7th month): Hōjō Hirotoki dies in Kamakura; and initially, Hōjō Sadaaki and Hōjō Mototoki share power.
 1315 (Shōwa 4, 10th month): Hōjō Tokiatsu assumes the role of Rokuhara Tandai in the capital city.
 1316 (Shōwa 5, 7th month): Hōjō Tokiatsu, who is the son of Hōjō Sadaaki, takes on the role of Shikken; and Hōjō Mototoki retires to a Buddhist monastery where he shaves his head.

Notes

References
 Nussbaum, Louis-Frédéric and Käthe Roth. (2005).  Japan encyclopedia. Cambridge: Harvard University Press. ;  OCLC 58053128
 Titsingh, Isaac. (1834). Nihon Odai Ichiran; ou,  Annales des empereurs du Japon.  Paris: Royal Asiatic Society, Oriental Translation Fund of Great Britain and Ireland. OCLC 5850691
 Varley, H. Paul. (1980). A Chronicle of Gods and Sovereigns: Jinnō Shōtōki of Kitabatake Chikafusa. New York: Columbia University Press. ;  OCLC 6042764

External links
 National Diet Library, "The Japanese Calendar" -- historical overview plus illustrative images from library's collection

Japanese eras
1310s in Japan